Acropolitis canigerana is a species of moth of the family Tortricidae. It is found in Australia.

References

Archipini
Moths described in 1863
Moths of Australia
Taxa named by Francis Walker (entomologist)